The Weapon Shops of Isher is a science fiction novel by Canadian writer A. E. van Vogt, first published in 1951. The novel is a fix-up created from three previously published short stories about the Weapon Shops and Isher civilization:
 "The Seesaw" (Analog Science Fiction and Fact, July 1941)
 "The Weapon Shop" (Analog Science Fiction and Fact, December 1942)
 "The Weapon Shops of Isher" (Wonder Stories, February 1949)

Overview
The Weapon Shops of Isher and its sequel The Weapon Makers detail the workings of Isher civilization and the adventures of Robert Hedrock, The One Immortal Man, as he keeps it in balance in the face of attempts by the Weapon Makers, who have forgotten their purpose as a permanent opposition, and the strong government of the Empress, Innelda Isher, with its intimate connections to a network of financial institutions, to undermine each other. The Weapon Shops provide the populace with defensive weapons and an alternative legal system.

The Isher/Weapon Shops novels are very rare examples of Golden Age science fiction that explicitly discuss the right to keep and bear arms, specifically guns. Indeed, the motto of the Weapon Shops, repeated several times, is "The right to buy weapons is the right to be free".  However, Van Vogt's guns have virtually magical properties, and can only be used in self-defense (or for suicide).

The political philosophy of the Weapon Shops is minimalist. They will not interfere with the corrupt imperial monarchy of the Isher government, because men always have a government of the type they deserve: no government, however bad, exists without at least the tacit consent of the governed. The mission of the Weapon Shops, therefore, is merely to offer single individuals the right to protect themselves with a firearm, or, in cases of fraud, access to a "Robin Hood" alternative court system that judges and awards compensation from large, imperial merchant combines to cheated individuals. Because the population has access to this alternative system of justice, the Isher government cannot take the final step toward totalitarianism.

The novel was published by Greenberg in New York in 1951.  It was also published as a paperback by Ace Books and in 1969 by New English Library in the U.K.

Reception
Boucher and McComas praised Weapon Shops as "a fine excitingly involved melodrama.". P. Schuyler Miller reviewed the novel favorably, reporting that "It will take agile wits to know just what is happening, or why, at any given time."  New York Times reviewer Basil Davenport found the opening segment "begins well enough," but as the novel progresses, the reader's attention becomes "badly divided."

In popular culture
 The Weapon Shop slogan, "The right to buy weapons is the right to be free", is often approvingly cited by supporters of the National Rifle Association and other advocates for gun rights.
 In Philippe Druillet's 1973 graphic novel Delirius, authorities encourage visitors to the gambling planet to arm themselves for their protection, and throughout the pages, there is some advertisement for "Isher" weapon shops here and there
 In F. Paul Wilson's Repairman Jack series of novels, the titular hero's weapon shop of choice is "Isher Sporting Goods". The secret basement of Isher Sporting Goods, where the weapons are stored, features a neon sign over the stairs that reads, "The right to buy weapons is the right to be free".
 S. M. Stirling in his Emberverse series of novels describes a post-apocalyptic world in which anything dependent on technology developed in the last 500 years (firearms, electricity, internal combustion engines, etc.) has been mysteriously rendered useless. The populace relies on bows, arrows, and swords for self-defense and to wage war. The Weapons Shop of Isherman and Sons manufactures swords.
 The Market Anarchist Center for a Stateless Society has referred to WikiLeaks as "Our Weapon Shop of Isher".
 The fictional government think tank created by Stephen King in his novel Firestarter is colloquially known as The Shop. It is stated that this is a direct reference to the Van Vogt novel.
 For decades, artist Tullio Proni designed and sold ray guns at science fiction conventions; he named his business Isher Enterprises (later Isher Artifacts).

Publication history

1966 — JAPAN, Tokyo Sogensha, 286p.
2016 — JAPAN, Tokyo Sogensha, 334p.(revised version,)

References

1951 Canadian novels
1951 science fiction novels
Novels by A. E. van Vogt